Molang is an animated children's television series created by the animation studio Millimages. The titular character, Molang, was designed by the Korean illustrator Hye-Ji Yoon on the platform KakaoTalk. The designer had said that the name originated from the word mallangmallang (말랑말랑) which means soft, squishy, and fluffy.

The series first aired on Canal+ France on November 2, 2015. Since then, 5 seasons, 321 episodes, and a music album have been produced and are widely broadcast. The first season has been available since July 1, 2019 on Netflix. In February 2020, Millimages announced the development of Season 5 which consists of 52 episodes with each being 5 minutes long. , Molang's TV exposure extends to more than 190 countries and has become a cross-media franchise, including merchandising, publishing, music albums, GIFs, digital series, stickers, and others.  Season 5 started broadcasting on Canal+ on September 9, 2021.

On November 11, 2021, the show announced that it would celebrate World Kindness Day in the UK on November 13.

Plot 
The series chronicles the relationship between roommates and best friends, Molang, an enthusiastic and optimistic rabbit, and Piu Piu, a timid but outgoing chicken. They pit their wits against numerous occurrences, ranging from everyday problems and sitcom-style situations, to extraordinary adventures that often turn dangerous and/or risky.

The show's animation and art style are heavily inspired by Japanese anime, with sweat drops on the characters' faces and particular expressions on their eyes, usually whenever they're extremely jovial, perplexed, frightened, or panicked.

Molang is defined by its empathy, softness, tenderness, and joy. Molang has no nationality, is ageless, and gender-neutral. The characters of Molang speak Molanguese.

Episodes

Discography

Albums

EPs 

On April 1, 2020, the first "music album" called Molang was released on every streaming platform, including Spotify, iTunes, Deezer, Amazon, and more. As of late April 2020, this album has been streamed more than 40,000 times on Spotify and 20,000 times on iTunes. On November 18, 2020, the EP A Merry Molang Christmas was released. There had been speculation regarding the release of the second music album, though this had yet to be confirmed. On December 10, 2020, the official social media account of Molang uploaded the first post introducing A Merry Molang Christmas.

Synopsis 
Seasons 1, 2, and 3:

Molang is an affectionate, humorous look at the relationship between an eccentric, joyful, and enthusiastic rabbit named Molang, and a shy, discreet, and emotional little chick named Piu Piu. The series explores Molang and Piu Piu's everyday life with warmth and humor.

Seasons 4 and 5:

Molang and Piu Piu's friendship goes back a long way. From the Stone Age to the 20th century, the heroes take over history with their invariable wit and good spirit. A true friendship standing the test of time, which reminds us that we can find happiness at all times!

Characters 

 Molang is a rabbit that makes every moment of the duo's daily life a unique and wonderful moment, taking special care of each detail, and giving little things an unexpected fresh taste. Molang puts its heart into everything it does, even when it gets it and its friend, Piu Piu, into trouble.
 Piu Piu is a little yellow chick. Shy, reserved, and someone who dislikes being the center of attention, it takes great care to keep things under control, something that Molang usually ruins with its antics. When something unexpected arises (and Molang's imagination makes it arise more than one time!), Piu Piu can be quickly destabilized.
 The Pincos: Molang and Piu Piu's friends are a group of miscellaneous rabbits that look identical in shape to their counterpart, Molang. They vary greatly in personality: some are friendly and well-meaning (like Molang), while others are soft-spoken and timid (like Piu Piu), while others are easily irritated and short-tempered (the beachgoers from The Coconut, the director from The Extras, etc.).

Broadcast 
Countries:
 United Kingdom: The series is broadcasting in Cartoonito since May 12, 2016 and ended on April 22, 2018. 5 months later, the series was moved to Tiny Pop, upon the channel's new logo debut on September 29, 2018.
 France: The series is broadcasting in Canal+ Family (now Canal+ Kids) & Piwi+ since November 2, 2015. The series was also debuted on TF1 since September 4, 2017.
 United States: The series is broadcasting in Disney Junior and Disney Channel since February 2016.
 Brazil: The series is broadcasting in Disney Junior Brazil since 2016. 2 years later, the series was debuted on TV Cultura since August 27, 2018.
 Italy: The series is broadcasting in Disney Junior Italy since 2016 to closure on May 1, 2020. A year later, the series was debuted in Rai YoYo since December 17, 2017.
 Ukraine: The series is broadcasting in Niki Junior since it started on November 15, 2017.
 Canada: The series is broadcasting in Canadian French channel Télé-Québec since 2016. Also, the series was broadcast in Knowledge Kids since April–July 2016, then was back in 2020. Since February 23, 2017, the series was debuted in BBC Kids to its closure on December 31, 2018. The series was moved now to Treehouse TV since July 6, 2020.
 Australia: The series is broadcasting in Disney Junior Australia in 2016, to its closing the channel on April 30, 2020. the series was moved to ABC in 2019.
 Indonesia: The series is broadcasting in RTV.
 Malaysia: The series is broadcasting in Monsta Channel since November 21, 2020.
 Middle East & North Africa: The series is broadcasting in Spacetoon.
 Germany: The series is broadcasting in KiKa since October 8, 2019, reruns on August 31, 2020 until November 30, 2020. Will be availabled only on the KiKa website. (German only)
 Spain & Portugal: The series is broadcasting in Canal Panda Spain since 2016, and in Portugal since June 1, 2020.
 Spain only: The series is broadcasting in Clan.
 China: The series is broadcasting in CCTV since January 29, 2019.
 Japan: The series is broadcasting in Disney Channel.
Others:
 The series is broadcasting on Kartoon Channel! all over the America. The first season is available since July 1, 2019 on Netflix. Available in all countries.

List of episodes

Merchandising 

As a merchandising brand, Molang uses "My Best Friend" as a universal signature for all worldwide licensees, on all packagings. It now represents two master toy licensees (Tomy & Jazwares), over 100 licensees worldwide, and more than 700 different products, including kids and adults apparels, children's books and magazines, stationery, magnets, stickers, underwear, sleepwear, etc.

Books 
In November 2016, the French publisher Flammarion launched a collection of four little square books based on the series episodes and one big album. On Easter 2017, seven new books were released. They were specially promoted by the broadcaster. Among them, four little square books and one album, and also two flap books in which children have to search for hidden characters and animals.

Scholastic Inc., the world's largest publisher of children's books, have published four 8x8 books and one album. All the books include stickers and the album contains a sticker storybook with more than 25 stickers and 4 pages to decorate. They are available to all national retailers, independents, special market channels and through Scholastic Reading Club and Scholastic Book Fairs. In October 2018, the Italian publisher Gribaudo has launched six activity books with games, colouring pages, stickers and different activities.

The publisher Nelson Verlag will launch a range of their mini books dedicated to Molang early 2020 in Germany.

DVDs

</onlyinclude>

References

External links
 
 Molang Official Website

2010s French animated television series
2010s South Korean animated television series
2020s French animated television series
2020s South Korean animated television series
French children's animated adventure television series
French children's animated comedy television series
French preschool education television series
South Korean children's animated adventure television series
South Korean children's animated comedy television series
Treehouse TV original programming
Animated television series about rabbits and hares
Television series about chickens
Animated television series without speech